The 1929 Cincinnati Reds season was a season in American baseball. The team finished seventh in the National League with a record of 66–88, 33 games behind the Chicago Cubs.

Off-season 
On December 13, 1928, the Reds traded away catcher Bubbles Hargrave to the St. Paul Saints of the American Association. Hargrave had been with the team since 1921, and he led the National League with a .353 batting average in 1926. In 766 games with the club, Hargrave batted .314 with 29 home runs and 359 RBI. The Reds received pitcher Paul Zahniser, who had a 13-10 record with a 3.57 ERA in 30 games with the Saints. Zahniser had previous experience in the American League, as he pitched with the Washington Senators from 1923-1924 and the Boston Red Sox from 1925-1926. Between the two clubs, Zahniser had a 26-47 record with a 4.62 ERA in 124 games, and he led the AL in losses with 18 in 1926.

Regular season 
Very early in the season, the Reds traded catcher Val Picinich to the Brooklyn Robins in exchange for pitcher Rube Ehrhardt and catcher Johnny Gooch. Ehrhardt had a 1-3 record with a 4.67 ERA in 28 games during the 1928 season with Brooklyn. In his five years with Brooklyn, Ehrhardt had a 21-32 record with a 4.10 ERA in 169 games, twice leading the NL in games finished in both 1926 and 1927. Gooch split the 1928 season between the Robins and Pittsburgh Pirates, batting .282 with 17 RBI in 73 games.

Following a bad start to the season with a 6-11 record in their first 17 games, the Reds won five of their next six games to improve to only one game under .500. The Reds then lost 14 of their next 15 games to fall into the NL cellar with a 12-26 record, 12.5 games out of first place.

The Reds would struggle throughout the season, batting the Philadelphia Phillies, Brooklyn Robins and Boston Braves to stay out of last place. A highlight during the season was a 21-4 victory over the Phillies in June, while the Reds shutout the pennant winning Chicago Cubs 9-0 in a late-season game.

Cincinnati finished the 1929 season in seventh place with a 66-88 record, 33 games behind the Cubs for first place. The 66 wins was the fewest by the club in a season since 1916, when they had a 60-93 record. The Reds attendance dropped by nearly 200,000 fans, as the club drew 295,040, their lowest total since 1918.

Outfielder Curt Walker led the team with a .313 batting average and in home runs with seven, while finishing second with 83 RBI in 141 games. First baseman High Pockets Kelly hit .293 with five home runs and a team best 103 RBI in 147 games. Rookie outfielder Evar Swanson hit .300 with four home runs and 43 RBI, while leading the team with 172 hits, 100 runs, and 33 stolen bases.

On the mound, Red Lucas had a breakout season, leading the Reds with a 19-12 record and a team best 3.60 ERA and 270 innings pitched in 32 games. Lucas led the National League with 28 complete games.

Season standings

Record vs. opponents

Roster

Player stats

Batting

Starters by position 
Note: Pos = Position; G = Games played; AB = At bats; H = Hits; Avg. = Batting average; HR = Home runs; RBI = Runs batted in

Other batters 
Note: G = Games played; AB = At bats; H = Hits; Avg. = Batting average; HR = Home runs; RBI = Runs batted in

Pitching

Starting pitchers 
Note: G = Games pitched; IP = Innings pitched; W = Wins; L = Losses; ERA = Earned run average; SO = Strikeouts

Other pitchers 
Note: G = Games pitched; IP = Innings pitched; W = Wins; L = Losses; ERA = Earned run average; SO = Strikeouts

Relief pitchers 
Note: G = Games pitched; W = Wins; L = Losses; SV = Saves; ERA = Earned run average; SO = Strikeouts

References 
1929 Cincinnati Reds season at Baseball Reference

Cincinnati Reds seasons
Cincinnati Reds season
Cincinnati Reds